Tanzina Vega is an American journalist. After reporting for the New York Times and CNN, she served as the weekday host of The Takeaway, a public radio show broadcast, until July 2021.

Background, education and early career

Vega was born in New York City. She identifies as a Latina of Puerto Rican ancestry. Vega grew up with her parents and brother on Manhattan's Lower East Side. Though they lived in public housing and were poor, both of her parents earned master's degrees.

With scholarship assistance from the I Have a Dream Foundation, and by working several jobs as a student, Vega was able to attend Stony Brook University on Long Island. She was a sociology major who minored in women’s studies and Latin/American/Caribbean studies. She graduated from Stony Brook in 1996.

Professional journalism career

In 2010, Vega was part of a team of New York Times journalists who won an Emmy Award for the documentary film "One in 8 Million" about the individual stories of New Yorkers. 
 In 2013, Vega persuaded Jill Abramson, then the executive editor of the New York Times,  to hire her as a national reporter on the newly created race and ethnicity beat. She covered the unrest in Ferguson, Missouri following the shooting death of Michael Brown, produced a series of video interviews of minority comedians, and covered microaggressions on college campuses. In 2015, her job title was eliminated, and she was reassigned to the metro desk to cover the courthouses in the Bronx. She soon left the newspaper, going to work for CNN, again covering issues related to social inequality, racial justice and the criminal justice system.

In 2017, she was a visiting lecturer at Princeton University, teaching a course called "The Media and Social Issues: Reporting on Race in America Today". She was also an Eisner Fellow at The Nation Institute.

In March, 2018, she was selected by WNYC and Public Radio International to be the weekday host of their morning radio show The Takeaway. The show's previous host was John Hockenberry, who retired in 2017, amid controversy. The show is broadcast on about 280 radio stations. Vega has continued her reportorial emphasis on race and inequality as a radio host. Vega announced her intention to cover economic inequality in her current job.

In 2019, she won the 15th annual Robert G. McGruder Distinguished Guest Lecture Award for media diversity at Kent State University.

Vega resigned as host of the Takeaway on July 23, 2021, amid an investigation conducted by WNYC's human resources department.

References

American journalists of Puerto Rican descent
Hispanic and Latino American women journalists
The New York Times writers
CNN people
Public Radio International personalities
Stony Brook University alumni
CUNY Graduate School of Journalism alumni